The Grease Factor is the second studio album by guitarist Shane Theriot. It was released in 2003.

Track listing

 Little Hat (4:50)
 Swish (5:12)
 Zodiac (4:08)
 Shrimp Boots (3:40)
 Dublin (5:43)
 Mr. Longhair (5:57)
 The Apartment (5:45)
 Slow (5:42)
 Woody (5:17)
 Zydefaux (3:52)
 Dear Ellen (1:15)

Personnel

 Shane Theriot - composer, producer, electric/acoustic guitars, programming
 Johnny Vidacovich - drums
 Russell Batiste - drums
 Victor Wooten - bass
 Adam Nitti- bass
 Doug Belote- drums
 David Northrup- drums
 Johnny Neel - Hammond B-3, keys
 Kiyoshi Tamai - voice
 Steve Conn - accordion
 Neal Cappellino - mixing/engineer

External links
 shanetheriot.com

References

2003 albums